This list of Russia-flagged cargo ships consists of vessels which are registered in Russia (or the Soviet Union) and subject to the laws of that country. Any ship which flew the flag at any point in its career, and is present in the encyclopedia, is listed here.

List of ships

List of classes 

 Omskiy type
 SA-15 type

References 

~
Cargo
Ship registration